Lars Christian Kjemhus (born 3 March 1994) is a Norwegian football midfielder who currently plays for 4. divisjon side NHH FK.

Career
Kjemhus started his career in minnows Bønes IL before joining the ranks of SK Brann. After a successful time with their junior team, Kjemhus started his senior career in Fana IL in 2014. After one season there he signed with Sogndal. He made his Norwegian Premier League debut in March 2016 against Bodø/Glimt.

February 5 2019, Kjemhus signed for Nest-Sotra. However, after not playing once, he featured for the Norwegian School of Economics students' team NHH FK in the autumn of 2019.

Career statistics

References

External links
 

1994 births
Living people
Footballers from Bergen
Norwegian footballers
Fana IL players
Sogndal Fotball players

Norwegian First Division players
Eliteserien players
Association football midfielders